Saint Vincent Ferrer Parish Church is the Roman Catholic parish church of Odiongan in Romblon in the Philippines. It falls under the jurisdiction of the Diocese of Romblon which in turn falls under the Archdiocese of Capiz. The church is located in Poblacion, the central town of the said municipality. The Church has a separate bell tower. It has porte-cochère with the statue of St. Vincent above but attached to the front outer wall of the church and is lit at night.

History 
One night in March 1888, the whole town of Odiongan including the church and the convent was set ablaze. The old remnant bell of the original church is said to have saved the town and the people. The bell was rung to wake up sleeping citizens and for them to evacuate. The bell was kept in casa tribunal(court house) and was recovered later on by Rev. Fr. Antonio Villar and was returned to the Catholic Church in 1970. The Church was renovated on the 15th of April 1985 through the selfless efforts of the parishioners. It was inaugurated during the pontificate of John Paul II and blessed by His Excellency The Most Reverend Nicolas Mondejar, Bishop of Romblon, on the 5th of April 1988.

Parish priests 

The parish priests who took charge of the parish of St. Vincent Ferrer were recorded by Mateo Meñez, chronicler of Odiongan, and was revised by Judge Silvino Cabrera, Sr.

See also 
 Banton Church

References 

Roman Catholic churches in Romblon
Churches in the Roman Catholic Diocese of Romblon